Lake Winnibigoshish is a body of water in north central Minnesota in the Chippewa National Forest. Its name comes from the Ojibwe language Wiinibiigoonzhish, a diminutive and pejorative form of Wiinibiig, meaning "filthy water" (i.e., "brackish water"). The name is related in structure to Lake Winnipeg and to the Algonquian name for Lake Winnebago, which the Ho-chunk (Winnebago) Nation was named after.

The Lake's area of 67,000 acres makes it the fourth largest in Minnesota. The headwaters of the Mississippi River begin at Lake Itasca (see Mississippi River Basin map); where it flows through Winnibigoshish, the Mississippi is at its widest - more than 11 miles.

The former Winnibigoshish Township (now unorganized), located on the north shore of Lake Winnibigoshish, in Itasca County, Minnesota, was named after this lake.

References

External links
 Lake Winnibigoshish Website
 Minnesota Department of Natural Resources Lake Information

Lakes of Cass County, Minnesota
Lakes of Itasca County, Minnesota
Reservoirs in Minnesota
Lakes of the Mississippi River
Chippewa National Forest